David Mobley may refer to:

David Mobley (golfer), American golfer
David Mobley (footballer) (born 1948), English footballer

See also
 David Morley (disambiguation)